Thompson Iyamu (born 22 October 1968), known by his stage name P Tee Money, is a British DJ/EDM producer, singer and remixer. He is also an author and actor.

Iyamu is a grandson of Akenzua II, Oba of Benin from 1933 – 1978. He is also the founder of the African film & music award (AFMA).

Early life and education
Iyamu was born in Islington, London. He is a member of the Benin Royal Family as the grandson of Akenzua II and nephew of Princess Elizabeth Olowu. He was introduced to music at a young age and early influences included George Duke and Earth, Wind & Fire.

At the age of four, his family moved to Nigeria where he completed his primary school, then was moved to a military academy. He received a degree in aeronautical engineering from the Nigerian Defence Academy. He later moved to London in 1988.

Career
Iyamu started using the stage name P Tee Money when he began his career as a DJ in the early nineties. He toured the UK with female Rap artist Weird MC in the latter half of 1990 and throughout 1991. His style developed into progressive house. 

In 2018, Iyamu collaborated with producers Matthew S and Dirty Freek on a remix album of the song "When I Came Up" with Bon Villan, a Toronto-based indie electronic trio group. On 8 September 2019 Iyamu and Morocco-based producer Yeves released a Dance Album; Bass Trouble which he co-wrote and co-produced.

On 16 May 2020 he released a single; Make some noise during the COVID-19 pandemic period which generated over 50,000 streams in the first week of release. On 22 July 2020 he released a new album; You Don't Care. One of the songs from the album contained an up-tempo beat that was influenced by music from the 1980s which featured Addie Nicole.

In November 2020, he released a new Afro beat single Overdose on Freshness collaborating with Pat-E, which he co-produced. On 1 January 2021 he released a new single titled Scream Out Loud (Banger Mix). On 12 March 2021 he released a new Spanish single titled Vamonos.

On 28 May 2021 Iyamu was featured on DJ S’ Tingling EP which he also co-produced and was released through his record label P Tee Money Music. On 4 July 2021 he released a new afro-beat sing titled Caterpillar.

On 21 August 2021, he released a new single OOzing featuring Pat-E. On 3 February 2022, he came back with a new single 360 on the highway.

Writing
In 2015, Iyamu launched his first book titled The Players Code which was intended as a less predatory take on pickup artistry.

In 2016, he released another book titled The Players Code Unleashed. He has also  written  series of erotic romance novels. In 2019 Iyamu published two more books Being Whit You and Wild Seduction, adding to his series of collections.

Acting
Iyamu has appeared in a number of motion pictures. He had roles in both I'll Sleep When I'm Dead (2003) and Lara Croft: Tomb Raider (2001). He was also featured in The Mummy video game (2000), as well as the live action sequel The Mummy Returns (2001).  He has acting credits in lower-budget movies as well, including Tom & Thomas (2002). He featured in The Scorpion King (2002).

Public Image 
Upon releasing his new single, 360 on the highway, Iyamu has been described by social media influencers and news medias as The most searched African celebrity on Google.

Books
 Being Whit You 
 Wild Seduction 
 The Players Code 
 The Players Code Unleashed

Discography

Albums

Singles

Philanthropy
Iyamu has set up a charity with the purpose of helping young people to start their own businesses. He is known for helping some of his fans who need help paying for their college tuition, and he has opened a charity for this purpose. He is responsible for providing for some of the youths from the village he supports in Edo state, Nigeria with free education, through his financial donations.

Personal life 
In February 2021, Iyamu lost one of his siblings and shortly afterwards he lost his father.

See also
 Akenzua II
 Akenzua family
 Princess Elizabeth Olowu
 Peju Layiwola

References

External links
 
 P Tee Money on Musicbrainz

1968 births
Living people
Electronic dance music DJs
British DJs
British film producers
British male film actors
British writers
Remixers
British people of Nigerian descent
Edo people
Akenzua family